Circus Renz was a German circus company, the name of which may also refer to:
 Circus Herman Renz, a Dutch circus company
 Circus Renz (1927 film), directed by Wolfgang Neff
 Circus Renz (1943 film), directed by Arthur Maria Rabenalt